Carolina Airport,  is an airport located  north of Michilla (es), a town in the Antofagasta Region of Chile. The airport is on the Pacific coast and serves the ore processing facility of the Michilla copper mine.

There is mountainous terrain to the east of the airport. South approach and departure are over the water.

See also

Transport in Chile
List of airports in Chile

References

External links
OpenStreetMap - Michilla
OurAirports - Carolina Airport
FallingRain - Carolina Airport

Airports in Antofagasta Region